Modernism is a movement in the arts in the late 19th and early 20th centuries, or more generally to modern thought, character, practice and/or the philosophy/ideology behind these.

Modernism or modernist may also refer to:
 Modernism in the Catholic Church, theological opinions expressed during the late 19th and early 20th centuries characterized by a break with the past
 Liberal Christianity, used in connection with the Fundamentalist–Modernist controversy
 Modernism (music), change and development in musical language that occurred at or around the turn of the 20th century
 Modern architecture, an architectural movement or style based upon new technologies of construction
 Modern art, artistic works produced roughly from the 1860s to the 1970s, and the style and philosophy of the art produced during that era
 Modernist literature, a self-conscious break with traditional styles of poetry and verse in the late 19th and early 20th centuries
 Modernist poetry, written, mainly in Europe and North America, between 1890 and 1950 in the tradition of modernist literature
 Moderne Algebra (1930), first textbook to axiomatically develop groups, rings, and fields
 Modernism/modernity, a peer-reviewed academic journal founded in 1994
 Modernism: A New Decade, a 1998 album by The Style Council
 "moDernisT", a 2015 remake of the song Tom's Diner 
 Modernism (Islam in Indonesia), a religious movement which puts emphasis on teachings purely derived from the Islamic religious scriptures

See also
 Modernisme, a cultural movement associated with the search for Catalan national identity
 Modernismo, a Spanish-American literary movement
 Modernity
 Postmodernism